This is a list of people buried at Willesden Jewish Cemetery at Beaconsfield Road, Willesden, in the London Borough of Brent, England.  Willesden Jewish Cemetery, which opened in 1873, has 29,800 graves; three of the tombs, including that of Rosalind Franklin, are listed at Grade II by Historic England.

The cemetery has 33 Commonwealth service war graves from World War I, six of which form a small group by the Assembly Hall, and 77 from World War II, 22 of them grouped in a war graves plot. These include the grave of Dudley Joel (1904–1941), businessman and Conservative Party politician, who died in World War II.

Grade II listed burial tombs

Other notable burials
Some of the other notable persons interred at the cemetery include:

Architects

Artists and art dealers

Lawyers

Medical doctors

Musicians

Politicians

Rabbis

Other

See also
 United Synagogue
 Willesden Jewish Cemetery
 Liberal Jewish Cemetery, Willesden
 Willesden New Cemetery
 Jewish cemeteries in the London area

Notes

References

External links
 Official website for Willesden Jewish Cemetery
United Synagogue: Our Cemeteries
Jewish Museum London video about the cemetery

Burials at Willesden Jewish Cemetery
Franklin family (Anglo-Jewish)
Cemetery, Willesden
Orthodox Judaism in London
Jewish Cemetery, Willesden
!
Jewish Cemetery